Afsar Nawaz (born 7 October 1976) is a Pakistani first-class cricketer who played for Karachi cricket team.

References

External links
 

1976 births
Living people
Pakistani cricketers
Karachi cricketers
Cricketers from Karachi